Landmark Partners, an SEC Registered  Advisor, is one of the most experienced participants in the  private equity secondary market for private equity (also known as secondaries) and real estate investments. Founded in 1989, the firm is a leading source of liquidity to owners of interests in venture, mezzanine, buyout, and real estate limited partnerships. Landmark Partners has four offices located in Boston, New York,  Simsbury, and London.

Investment program 
Landmark Partners has formed private equity and real estate funds with approximately $15.5 billion of committed capital invested with over 700 sponsors in over 1,800 partnership interests (as of 12/31/15).

In 2015, Landmark Partners closed, Landmark Real Estate Fund VII (LREF VII), with capital commitments of $1.6 billion

In 2014, Landmark Partners closed, Landmark Equity Partners XV (LEP XV), with capital commitments of $3.3 billion

Affiliations
Francisco L. Borges, Managing Partner of Landmark Partners, is a member of the CPTV Board of Trustees.

References

External links
 Official Website
 Institutional investor profile, Landmark Partners Europe (AltAssets)
 Landmark Partners Sponsor Overview (Institutional Real Estate, Inc.)
 The Private Equity Analyst Guide to the Secondary Market (2004 Edition)—DowJones Private Equity Analyst

Financial services companies established in 1989
Companies based in Hartford County, Connecticut
Private equity firms of the United States
Private equity secondary market